Wallace Smith may refer to:

Wallace Smith (boxer) (1924–1973), American world lightweight boxing champion
Wallace Smith (footballer) (1881–1917), English footballer 
W. Wallace Smith (1900–1989), Prophet-President of the Reorganized Church of Jesus Christ of Latter Day Saints 
Wallace B. Smith (born 1929), Prophet-President of the Reorganized Church of Jesus Christ of Latter Day Saints 
Wallace Smith (screenwriter)

See also
Wally Smith (disambiguation)